Wesburn was a railway station on the Warburton line in (Wesburn) Melbourne, Australia. Originally called West Warburton, the station operated until the line's closure in 1965.  The only remnant of the station is the crumbling retaining wall of the platform.

External links
The station shortly before closing, 24 November 1964.

 

Disused railway stations in Melbourne
Railway stations in Australia opened in 1901
Railway stations closed in 1965
1965 disestablishments in Australia